St. Agnes Academic High School is a former all-girls, private, Roman Catholic high school in Queens, New York.  It was located within the Roman Catholic Diocese of Brooklyn, and was established in 1908 by the Sisters of St. Dominic.

St. Agnes held its first graduation for 6 students in 1912. The school was originally co-educational, but shifted its focus to all-girls education in the aftermath of the Second World War. The current building was built in 1958.

St. Agnes had been affiliated with the Catholic University of America, Washington, D.C., and been accredited by the Middle States Association of Colleges and Schools.

The school was closed in June 2021 due to financial hardships.

College Partners

Molloy College

St. Agnes Academic High School had partnered with Molloy College to match student interests with college resources with a program named D.R.E.A.M. BIG. Offering an up-close and personal look at college and careers, students gain valuable insight from accomplished leaders in higher education through a series of experiences, seminars, and workshops at St. Agnes and at the Molloy College campus in Rockville Centre.

The D.R.E.A.M BIG Program offers:
Building Your Future in STEM: From High School to College
The Molloy College Center for Environmental Research and Coastal Oceans Monitoring Blue Point Oyster Hatchery
The Humanities and Technology
TV Studio Workshop
Law & Order Seminar
Dance/Theatre/Art Workshop
Choosing a Career Path

St. John's University

The St. John's College Advantage Program (CAP) provided qualified seniors the opportunity to enroll in college credit courses from the university while still enrolled in high school.  St. Agnes currently offers CAP courses in British Authors, College Writing, Advanced Algebra, Calculus, Human Biology, People and the Environment, Psychology, Psychology of Women, and Emergence of a Global Society.

SUNY Albany

The SUNY at Albany Science Research Program was open to Grades 10, 11 and 12, students are eligible to receive up to 12 college credits. Students work one-on-one with a mentor on a science research project of their choosing.

Extracurricular activities

Art Club
Book Club
Cooking Club
Dance Club
Dominican Youth Preachers for Justice and Peace
Drama Club
Foreign Film Club
Help-A-Paw
Interact
Liturgical Dance
Mock Trial Club
Multi-culture Club
National Honors Society
Operation Shoebox
Photography Club
Students Against Destructive Decisions (SADD)
Science Olympiad
Scrap-booking
Star Wars Club
Student Council
Teens For Life
Track Club
T.V. Studio
Veritas (School Newspaper)
Yearbook

References

External links
 School Website

Educational institutions established in 1908
Girls' schools in New York City
Roman Catholic Diocese of Brooklyn
1908 establishments in New York City
Roman Catholic high schools in Queens, New York